Zareef Ahmad Zareef (born 17 April 1943) is a Kashmiri poet, writer, social activist and environmentalist. He is best known for his satirical poetry and efforts to highlight various social and political problems. He has been working for the preservation of the environment, culture and heritage of Kashmir.

Early life and education
Zareef Ahmed Zareef was born as Zareef Ahmed Shah in 1943 in the downtown city of Srinagar(Aali Kadal) to Ghulam Mohi-ud-Din. His father owned an embroidery workshop, in a locality which was also a hub for hakeems, Sufis, poets, traders, and merchants, hence he was brought up in an environment that was full of wisdom and philosophy, which deeply influenced his personality and character. From childhood, he held the Sufi saint Khawja Habibullah Ataar in great esteem and visits his mausoleum regularly to pay obeisance. Zareef received his education from Islamia High School, Rajouri Kadal. Being an enthusiast – a regular face in seminars, symposiums, debates and annual functions throughout his formative years. Receiving guidance from his teachers and noted writers especially Sattar Shahid, eventually he found himself uttering the lines expressing personal feelings and thoughts on the stage. He soon developed the ambition to become a poet.

Career

Government Service
In 1968, Zareef was appointed as scriptwriter in the Department of Information While serving in the cultural unit of Department of Information he remained active in organising public shows, dramas, mushairas and features on an unparalleled scale in various parts of the state. His writings were instrumental in evoking greater response from the public which helped the department in achieving various goals. He retired from the department as assistant cultural officer.

Writing
After retirement started his life as a poet; Kashmiri being the medium. Style of writing remained mainly apprehensive and humorous. Thrust of the poetry has been to portray the social evils and exterminate them by arousing public consciousness. Imbalances in the society, plight of the weaker sections and environmental filth have remained the main theme of the writings.

Influence
It was Mr. Ghulam Ahmed Mir Abid, an unknown writer, who showed him to use his own imaginative powers and fine tuned his writing aptitude while Hakeeem Manzoor an eminent Urdu writer introduced him to the great beauty of verse and the profoundness of the literature.

Published works
Zareef has, so far, authored four (4) books:
 Khabar Togme Wanun, 2007 (a compilation of essays reflecting eclectic issues and problems of our society.)
 Taaran Garee, 2012 (a compilation of satirical poems)
 Kath cha Taeti, 2014 (a compilation of social, political, cultural essays)
 T'choenche poot, 2016 (a compilation of poems and prose for kids)

Other activities
After retirement from the government service, Zareef's services have been utilized in the numerous public, social and literary fields. He has been selected/chosen as:-
 Chairman, Ahad Zargar Memorial Research Foundation, Kashmir.
 Chairman, Valley Citizens Council, Kashmir (an organization looking after the common problems of the people).
 Writer and Member, Rajeev Gandhi Foundation, Kashmir Syllabus Committee.

Awards and appreciation
 Zareef has been awarded and appreciated for his works in different social, cultural, environmental and literary fields by various associations and organizations:
 Sahitya academy award, for his book "Tchoonch poot"
 Ahad Zargar Memorial Award in 2010, for prominent works in literary field.
 He was also given the Green Citizen Award in 2011 by Rahim Greens (member of International association for voluntary effort) for his contribution in protecting the environment of Kashmir.

References

External links
 Zareef Ahmad Zareef at The Kashmir Walla

1943 births
Living people
Indian environmentalists
Kashmiri poets
Kashmiri writers
People from Srinagar
Writers from Jammu and Kashmir